Nangilickondan (also called Nangilickondan) is a village in Villupuram district, Tamil Nadu. It has located between Gingee and Tindivanam road. The village is patrolled by Gingee police. Nearest railway station is in Tindivanam. Nearest Airport is Chennai about 145 km.

References

Villages in Viluppuram district